Serixia quadrina is a species of beetle in the family Cerambycidae. It was described by Francis Polkinghorne Pascoe in 1867. It is known from Moluccas.

References

Serixia
Beetles described in 1867